Wong Chung (17 July 1880 - 25 July 1963) was an American film actor. He began with the Asia Film Company, and he appeared in Tou Shaoya and Stealing a Roast Duck (1909), both directed by Leung Siu-bo. He appeared in Barbary Coast (1935), in which he was the only Asian actor listed in the opening credits, unlike the Asian actors from the period.

Filmography

References

External links
 

1880 births
1963 deaths
American male film actors
20th-century American male actors
American male actors of Chinese descent